Miriam Byrd-Nethery (May 17, 1929 – January 6, 2003) was an American actress. Her film roles included Bound for Glory (1976) and Leatherface: The Texas Chainsaw Massacre III and Across Five Aprils (both 1990).

Personal life 
Byrd-Nethery was one of five siblings born in Lewisville, Arkansas to Daniel Thompson "Tom" Nethery and Ruby Estelle Byrd. She was married to Clu Gulager. Their sons are John and Tom Gulager. 

Byrd-Nethery died in Los Angeles on January 6, 2003, at age 73 following a long battle with a brain tumor, which had also cost her sight in one eye.

Filmography 
Mr. T and Tina (1976 TV) – Miss Llewellyn
The Big Bus (1976) – Farmer's Wife
Bound for Glory (1976) – Sick Woman – Water-Swallowing Scene (as Miriam Byrd Nethery)
Victory at Entebbe (1976 TV) – Nun's Ward
Nickelodeon (1976) – Aunt Lula
Deadly Game (1977 TV) – Polly
Just Me and You (1978 TV) – Connie
Steel Cowboy (1978 TV) – Waitress
Like Normal People (1979 TV) – Billie
Angel Dusted (1981) (TV)
Lies (1985) – Night Nurse (credited as Miriam Byrd Nethery)
Walk Like a Man (1987) – Toy Store Cashier
The Offspring (aka From a Whisper to a Scream; 1987) – Eileen BurnsideSummer Heat (1987) – Aunt PattyAct II (1987 TV) – Dede McKennaStepfather II (aka The Stepfather 2: Make Room for Daddy; 1989) – Sally JenkinsLeatherface: The Texas Chainsaw Massacre III (1990) – Mama SawyerDan Turner, Hollywood Detective (aka The Raven Red Kiss-Off; 1990 TV) – Motel ManagerAcross Five Aprils (aka Civil War Diary (USA: video title; 1990)) – Ellen CreightonIn the Line of Duty: Ambush in Waco (1993 TV) – HarrietVic (short film; 2006) – Mary Kay (final film role)

TV appearancesStarsky and Hutch (episode: "Running"; February 25, 1976) – Old WomanBarney Miller (episode: "The Accusation"; October 12, 1978; credited as Miriam Byrd Nethery) – Doris WhittakerAlice (episode: "The Principal of the Thing"; December 10, 1978) – HenriettaThe Dukes of Hazzard (episode: "Double Sting"; May 11, 1979) – Rose EllenBarney Miller (episode: "The Bird"; November 8, 1979; credited as Miriam Byrd Nethery) – Myrna DunbarYoung Maverick (episode: "Makin' Tracks"; January 9, 1980)The Dukes of Hazzard (episode: "Southern Comfurts"; March 21, 1980; credited as Miriam Byrd Nethery) – Holly ComfurtCharlie's Angels playing "Flo Bartlett" (episode: "Moonshinin' Angels"; January 24, 1981) – Flo BartlettBarney Miller (episode: "The Librarian"; February 19, 1981; credited as Miriam Byrd Nethery) – Louise AustinBarney Miller (episode: "Altercation"; April 9, 1982) – Beverly Wakefield Quincy (episode: "Unreasonable Doubt"; November 10, 1982) – Annie – the MaidMr. Belvedere (episode: "Strike"; November 15, 1985) – Marie TingleHighway to Heaven (episode: "Wally"; January 14, 1987) – MargaretMr. Belvedere (episode: "Jobless"; January 23, 1987) – Edna WilksMr. Belvedere'' (episode: "Fear of Flying"; November 4, 1989) – Ethel

References

External links 
 

1929 births
2003 deaths
20th-century American actresses
21st-century American actresses
Actresses from Arkansas
American film actresses
American television actresses
People from Lewisville, Arkansas
Deaths from brain cancer in the United States